Tenebrincola is a genus of sea snails, marine gastropod mollusks in the family Volutidae. It is a Western Pacific abyssal genus, which is defined by a very thin, smooth shell, a radula of the fulgorarid type, and the presence of an operculum. Its phylogenetic relationship with the Asian fulgorarids needs to be clarified.

Species
Species within the genus Tenebrincola include:

 Tenebrincola cukri (Rokop, 1972)

The species includes two populations: Tenebrincola cukri cukri (Rokop, 1972) - Baja California and Tenebrincola cukri frigida Harasewych & Kantor, 1991 - Aleutian Trench.

References

Volutidae
Monotypic gastropod genera